This article presents a sortable table of U.S. states sorted by their American Human Development Index, according to Measure of America. The data were taken from the American Human Development Report. 

The territories of the United States are listed separately (they were not included in Measure of America's report); the territories data is from a different source (based on United Nations Development Programme), which uses a different numbering system.



States and federal district

Territories

See also
List of U.S. states by Human Development Index
List of U.S. states by GDP per capita
List of U.S. congressional districts by life expectancy
Measure of America
Thank God for Mississippi

References

External links

 Correlation of Human Development Index with Google Searches in different U.S. states

Human Development Index
United States demography-related lists
Human Development Index
U.S.